Caroline Mary Moorehead  (born 28 October 1944) is a human rights journalist and biographer.

Early life
Born in London, Moorehead is the daughter of Australian war correspondent Alan Moorehead and his English wife Lucy Milner. She received a BA from the University of London in 1965.

Writing
Moorehead has written six biographies, of Bertrand Russell, Heinrich Schliemann, Freya Stark, Iris Origo, Martha Gellhorn, Sidney Bernstein, and Henriette-Lucy, Marquise de La Tour du Pin Gouvernet, the daughter in law of Jean-Frédéric de la Tour du Pin, who experienced the French Revolution and left a rich collection of letters as well as a memoir that cover the decades from the fall of the Ancien Régime up to the rise of Napoleon III.

Moorehead has also written many non-fiction pieces centered on human rights including a history of the International Committee of the Red Cross, Dunant's Dream, based on previously unseen archives in Geneva, Troublesome People, a book on pacifists, and a work on terrorism, Hostages to Fortune. A work in this category on refugees in the modern world, Human Cargo, was published in 2004. Moorehead has also published A Train in Winter, a book which focuses on 230 French women of the Resistance who were sent to Auschwitz, on Convoi des 31000, and of whom only forty-nine survived. Her book Village of Secrets (2014) is on a similar theme, describing a story where a wartime French village helped 3,000 Jews to safety.

Moorehead has written many book reviews for assorted papers and reviews, including Literary Review, The Times Literary Supplement, Daily Telegraph, Independent, Spectator, and New York Review of Books. She specialized in human rights as a journalist, contributing a column first to The Times and then the Independent, and co-producing and writing a series of programs on human rights for BBC Television.

Appointments
She is a trustee and director of Index on Censorship and a governor of the British Institute of Human Rights. She has served on the committees of the Royal Society of Literature, of which she is a Fellow; the Society of Authors; English PEN; and the London Library. She also helped start a legal advice centre for asylum seekers from the Horn of Africa in Cairo, where she helps run a number of educational projects.

Honours
She was elected a Fellow of the Royal Society of Literature in 1993. She was appointed an OBE in 2005 for services to literature.

Selected publications
 Hostages to Fortune: A Study of Kidnapping in the World Today. New York: Atheneum, 1980.  
 Sidney Bernstein: A Biography. London: J. Cape, 1984. 
 Freya Stark. New York, N.Y., U.S.A.: Viking, 1986. 
 Troublesome People: Enemies of War: 1916-1986. London: Hamilton, 1987. 
 Betrayal: A Report on Violence Toward Children in Today's World. New York: Doubleday, 1990. 
 Bertrand Russell: A Life. New York: Viking, 1992. 
 Lost and Found: The 9,000 Treasures of Troy : Heinrich Schliemann and the Gold That Got Away. New York: Viking, 1996. 
 Dunant's Dream: War, Switzerland, and the History of the Red Cross. New York: Carroll & Graf Pub, 1999. 
 Iris Origo: Marchesa of Val D'Orcia. Boston: David R. Godine, 2002. 
 Gellhorn: A Twentieth-Century Life. New York: H. Holt, 2003. 
 Human Cargo: A Journey Among Refugees. New York: H. Holt, 2005.  
 Dancing to the Precipice: The Life of Lucie De La Tour Du Pin, Eyewitness to an Era. New York: HarperCollins, 2009. 
 A Train in Winter: An Extraordinary Story of Women, Friendship, and Resistance in Occupied France. New York: HarperCollins Publishers, 2011. 
 Village of Secrets: Defying the Nazis in Vichy France. Harper, 2014.

References

External links
http://bookcriticscircle.blogspot.com "Critical Mass"
http://www.rlf.org.uk  "Current Fellows: Caroline Moorehead"
http://entertainment.timesonline.co.uk "Current affairs: Human Cargo by Caroline Moorehead"
 

1944 births
Living people
British human rights activists
Women human rights activists
English biographers
Fellows of the Royal Society of Literature
Officers of the Order of the British Empire
Alumni of the University of London
English people of Australian descent
21st-century biographers